Raymond D. Whitney (born May 8, 1972) is a Canadian former professional ice hockey player in the National Hockey League (NHL). He was given the nickname "The Wizard" for his passing and playmaking skills.

Whitney is considered to have been one of the most underrated players in the NHL, as his name has rarely been mentioned amongst hockey fans and writers despite his consistently high point-production throughout his entire 22-year career, making him one of the top 65 point producers in the history of the NHL. On January 29, 2016, Whitney became the first Spokane Chiefs player to have their number retired (#14). He won the Stanley Cup with the Carolina Hurricanes in 2006.

Playing career
Long before Whitney played in the NHL, he and his brother Dean were stick boys for the NHL's Wayne Gretzky era Edmonton Oilers.  The third stick boy with the Whitney brothers was another future NHL player, Ryan Smyth.

During his junior career, Whitney spent three years with the Spokane Chiefs of the Western Hockey League (WHL), leading the entire league with 185 points during the 1990-91 season.  Whitney and the Chiefs won the 1991 Memorial Cup as champions of the Canadian Hockey League.

Whitney was the second player ever drafted by the San Jose Sharks, picked in the second round (23rd overall) in the 1991 NHL Entry Draft. Pat Falloon, his teammate with the WHL's Spokane Chiefs, was the Sharks' first pick. The Sharks had thought the pair would be a natural scoring combination, but that didn't pan out. Whitney started his professional career in the 1991-92 season, playing with teams in the German Deutsche Eishockey Liga and the International Hockey League, as well as two games with the San Jose Sharks.  He developed into a regular with San Jose over the next two seasons.

Whitney has played for several different NHL teams during his 24-year career, including the San Jose Sharks (1991–92 to 1996–97), Edmonton Oilers (1997–98), Florida Panthers (1997–98 to 2000–01), Columbus Blue Jackets (2000–01 to 2002–03),  Detroit Red Wings (2003–04), Carolina Hurricanes, Phoenix Coyotes, and Dallas Stars (details below).

On August 6, 2005, Whitney signed a two-year contract with the Carolina Hurricanes paying him $1.5 million per year. In his first season with the Hurricanes in 2005–06, Whitney helped Carolina win their first Stanley Cup with fellow Fort Saskatchewan native Mike Commodore.

On February 8, 2007, Whitney scored a natural hat trick in just 1 minute and 40 seconds.

On April 13, 2007, Whitney re-signed with the Hurricanes, agreeing to a three-year contract that pays him $3.5 million per year.

On July 1, 2010, Whitney signed a 2-year deal with the Phoenix Coyotes for $3 million per year.

Whitney is known for his comedic tendencies for doing such things as making sure he's visible in pre-game on-screen interviews behind the interviewee, leading to the Hurricanes fans' favorite game of "Where's Whitney"? His commonly used nickname is "Wizard," which was originally given to him by former Florida Panthers play-by-play commentator Jeff Rimer.

Whitney was the last remaining member of the San Jose Sharks inaugural team (1991–92) active in the NHL until his retirement on January 21, 2015. He was also the last remaining active player to get his start in the NHL as a member of the expansion San Jose Sharks.

On March 31, 2012, Whitney became only the 79th player in the history of the NHL to score 1,000 regular-season points, when he registered an assist in a game against the Anaheim Ducks.  As of the end of the 2013-14 season, he is number 62 all time for regular-season points in the NHL.

On July 1, 2012, Whitney signed a 2-year, $9 million contract with the Dallas Stars.

On January 21, 2015, he announced his retirement as an NHL player, ending a career after producing 1,064 points (385-679) in 1,330 regular-season games. At the time of his retirement, he was the leader in points, assists and games played for the entire 1991 NHL draft class.

Personal life
Ray and wife Brijet married in 2000 and have three children; two daughters and a son. He is known by his nickname "The Wizard". He has no connection to New Amsterdam Pink Whitney Vodka, despite having been a teammate of Spittin' Chiclets' Paul Bissonnette with the Coyotes.

International play
Whitney has been a member of Team Canada at four different Ice Hockey World Championships.  He made his debut at the 1998 World Championship, recording six points in seven games while Canada finished out of the medals. Whitney notched seven points in 10 games at the 1999 World Championship, again missing a medal when Canada lost in the semifinals to the Czech Republic. He joined Team Canada at the 2002 World Championship with Canada again failing to medal. At the 2010 World Championship, Whitney replaced Ryan Smyth as Canada's captain, when Smyth broke his foot early in the tournament.  Canada did not win a medal in that year's world championship.

Career statistics

Regular season and playoffs

International

Awards and honours

See also
List of NHL players with 1000 points
List of NHL players with 1000 games played

References

External links

1972 births
Living people
Canadian ice hockey left wingers
Carolina Hurricanes players
Carolina Hurricanes scouts
Columbus Blue Jackets players
Dallas Stars players
Detroit Red Wings players
Edmonton Oilers players
Florida Panthers players
Ice hockey people from Alberta
Kansas City Blades players
Kentucky Thoroughblades players
National Hockey League All-Stars
Phoenix Coyotes players
San Diego Gulls (IHL) players
San Jose Sharks draft picks
San Jose Sharks players
Spokane Chiefs players
People from Fort Saskatchewan
Stanley Cup champions
Utah Grizzlies (IHL) players
Canadian expatriate ice hockey players in the United States